Lavreotiki is a municipality at the southeasternnmost tip of the Attica peninsula in the Greek regional unit of East Attica. Its municipal seat is the town of Laurium (Lavrio).

It is historically important as a significant ancient mining district, most notably in the villages of Laurium and Thorikos on the southeastern seaboard during the 6th, 5th, and 4th centuries BCE. As such it financed the wealth of Athens and the emergence of the Athenian Empire through the slave-powered mining efforts for silver and lead, beginning with the discovery of 2 deep-vein mining efforts during the 480's.  Prior to that development, which at Themistocles urging in 483 BC led to the expansion of the Athenian fleet to 200 ships, only surface-mining was deployed as a technique for harvesting silver.  More than 250 ore washeries have been identified by archaeologists and geologists in the district.

Municipality
The municipality Lavreotiki was formed at the 2011 local government reform by the merger of the following 3 former municipalities, that became municipal units:
Agios Konstantinos
Keratea
Lavreotiki

The municipality has an area of 175.798 km2, the municipal unit 35.484 km2.

Settlements

The main settlements within the municipal unit of Lavreotiki are (population at 2011 census):
Lavrio (7,078)
Kato Poseidonia (397)
Legrena (289)
Thorikos (227)
Ano Thoriko (215)
Kato Sounio (127)
Kaki Thalassa (127)

Historical population

References

Sources
 Austin, M M., and P Vidal-Naquet. Economic and Social History of Ancient Greece: an Introduction. 1st English ed. Berkeley: University of California P, 1977. 1-397.
 Fine, John V. A. The Ancient Greeks: A Critical History.  Harvard University Press, 1983
 Finley, M.I., The Ancient Economy.  2nd Ed.  Berkeley: University of California Press, 1985, c1973
 Healy, John F.  Mining and Metallurgy in the Greek and Roman World.  London: Thames and Hudson, 1978.
 Hopper, R J. Trade and Industry in Classical Greece. London: Thames and Hudson, 1979. 6-240.

External links
Official website 
Ores from the ore washeries in the Lavriotiki

Populated places in East Attica
Municipalities of Attica